is the 11th studio album by Japanese singer/songwriter Chisato Moritaka, released on July 16, 1997 by One Up Music. The album marked the 10th anniversary of Moritaka's music career.  A limited edition release was packaged in a cardboard box and included 13 photographs; each with lyrics to a corresponding song.

Peachberry draws inspiration from Moritaka's love of the Beatles' music, with some of the tracks recorded at Abbey Road Studios. The song "Tony Slavin" is named after the Liverpool barber shop that the Beatles referenced in their 1967 song "Penny Lane".

The album reached No. 4 on Oricon's albums chart and sold over 322,000 copies. It was also Moritaka's last studio album to be certified Gold by the RIAJ.

Track listing 
All lyrics are written by Chisato Moritaka; all music is arranged by Yuichi Takahashi, except where indicated.

Personnel 
 Chisato Moritaka – vocals, drums (all tracks), tambourine (2, 10), shaker (2), timbales (6), recorder (7), accordion (7), piano (8), kalimba (8), pianica (11), clarinet (12), percussion (13)
 Yuichi Takahashi – guitar (1–2, 4–5, 7, 9–11, 13), keyboards (1–3, 5, 7–9, 11, 13)
 Shin Hashimoto – piano (1–2, 5, 7, 9, 11, 13), Fender Rhodes (1, 3, 5, 8), synthesizer (2, 5, 8–9), Wurlitzer (4), guitar (7, 11), kalimba (8), taishōgoto (13)
 Shin Kōno – piano (6, 10), Fender Rhodes (6, 10), percussion (6), keyboards (10)
 Yukio Seto – bass (1–2, 4–5, 7–8, 11, 13), guitar (1–7, 9–10, 13), conga (1), shaker (1, 6), bar chimes (5, 9–10), percussion (5, 13), djembe (8–9, 11), didgeridoo (8), timbales (9)
 Masafumi Yokoyama – bass (6, 10)
 Shuhei Miyachi – bell (4)
 Toshio Araki – trumpet (6)
 Kōji Nishimura – trumpet (6)
 Masakuni Takeno – alto saxophone (6)
 Takuo Yamamoto – tenor saxophone (6, 10), flute (6)
 Masanori Hirohara – trombone (6)
 Junko Yamashiro – bass trombone (6)
 Something Else – backing vocals (2)
 Nobutaka Okubo
 Daisuke Itō
 Chihiro Imai

Charts

Certification

References

External links 
 
 
 

1997 albums
Chisato Moritaka albums
Japanese-language albums